A list of racehorses which have won the same race on three or more occasions.

Footnotes

See also
 List of leading Thoroughbred racehorses
 List of historical horses
 Thoroughbred racing in New Zealand
 Harness racing in New Zealand

References

Lists of horse racing results
Horse races